This is a list of television ratings for NBA Finals in the United States, based on Nielsen viewing data. The highest rated and most watched NBA Finals series was the 1998 NBA Finals between the Chicago Bulls and Utah Jazz, which averaged an 18.7 rating / 33 share and 29.04 million viewers on NBC. That series also featured the highest rated and most watched NBA Finals game, as the Sunday night averaged a 22.3 rating / 38 share and 35.89 million viewers. The 1987 NBA Finals between the Los Angeles Lakers and Boston Celtics was the highest rated and most watched NBA Finals series on CBS, averaging a 15.9 rating / 32 share and 24.12 million viewers. Game 7 of the 1988 NBA Finals registered the network's highest rated and most watched NBA game with a 21.2 rating / 37 share.

The 2015 NBA Finals between the Golden State Warriors and Cleveland Cavaliers was the highest rated NBA Final series on ABC averaging an 11.6 rating / 21 share and 19.94 million viewers. The 2017 NBA Finals featuring the same two teams was the most watched NBA Final series on ABC averaging an 11.3 rating / 22 share and 20.38 million viewers. Game 7 of the 2016 NBA Finals registered the network's highest rated and most watched NBA game with an average 15.8 rating / 29 share and 31.02 million viewers. It was the first basketball game to draw more than 30 million average viewers  in 18 years, and only the seventh non-NFL sports telecast (excluding the Olympics) to have done so since 1998.

The 2019 NBA Finals between the Golden State Warriors and the Toronto Raptors had a drop in American viewership. Analysts cited the presence of a Canadian team (Canadian viewership does not count towards U.S. Nielsen ratings, leading to only one U.S. home market being reflected in viewership), as a factor in the drop. At the same time, the presence of the Toronto Raptors in the NBA Finals boosted Canadian viewership to record levels.

For the 2020 NBA Finals, the ratings dropped to a historic low, with one of the games drawing only 5.9 million viewers. The average viewers figure over 6 games was 7.5 million, which is a 51% decline from the previous year. Some have claimed this was due to the players' political activism; others have claimed this was due to the finals being played out of season caused by the COVID-19 pandemic even though more audience stayed at home, as other sports such as the NHL playoffs and the MLB playoffs also showed a significant decline in ratings.

Single game superlatives (1987–present)

Highest rated
 1998 Game 6 – 22.3

 1988 Game 7 – 21.5
 1993 Game 6 – 20.3

Lowest rated
 2020 Game 3 – 3.1
 2020 Game 2 – 3.6
 2020 Game 1 – 4.1

Most watched
 1998 Game 6 – 35.89 million
 1993 Game 6 – 32.10 million
 2016 Game 7 – 31.02 million

Least watched
 2020 Game 3 – 5.94 million
 2020 Game 2 – 6.61 million
 2020 Game 1 – 7.41 million

Game-by-game breakdown by year (1974–present)

Figures are expressed as Rating/Share. Rating represents the percentage of US TV households that watched the game, Share represents the percentage of TV sets in use that were tuned to the game. Note that game-by-game viewership for pre-2000 series were generally unavailable.

See also
 Super Bowl television ratings
 Stanley Cup Finals television ratings
 World Series television ratings
 MLS Cup television ratings

Notes

References

External links
 NBA Finals TV Ratings, 1974-2008
 NBA Finals Numbers Game

National Basketball Association Finals
National Basketball Association on television
ESPN
ABC Sports
CBS Sports
Basketball on NBC
Lists of most popular media